Antennablennius hypenetes, the Arabian blenny, is a species of combtooth blenny found in the western Indian ocean, from the northern Red Sea to the Persian Gulf.

References

hypenetes
Fish described in 1871
Taxa named by Carl Benjamin Klunzinger